Joseph Beresford (26 February 1906 –  26 February 1978) was an English footballer, who played over 250 games for Aston Villa. Beresford joined Villa from Mansfield Town in 1927 and left in 1935 to Preston North End.

He made one appearance for England on 16 May 1934 against Czechoslovakia.

References

External links
Joe Beresford's Bio at Aston Villa Player Database

1906 births
1978 deaths
People from Bolsover
Footballers from Derbyshire
Mansfield Town F.C. players
Aston Villa F.C. players
Preston North End F.C. players
English footballers
England international footballers
English Football League players
English Football League representative players
Association football forwards
FA Cup Final players